The National Assembly is the unicameral legislature of Serbia. The assembly is composed of 250 deputies who are proportionally elected to four-year terms by secret ballot. The assembly elects a president (speaker) who presides over the sessions.

The National Assembly exercises supreme legislative power. It adopts and amends the Constitution, elects Government, appoints the Governor of the National Bank of Serbia and other state officials. All decisions are made by majority vote of deputies at the session at which a majority of deputies are present, except for amending the Constitution, when a two-thirds majority is needed.

The assembly convenes in the House of the National Assembly in Belgrade.

History

Early history 

From the beginning of the 19th century, National Assembly sessions were called by Serbian monarchs. Sessions were also held during the First and Second Serbian uprising. The members were not elected, but rather appointed by the monarch, and sessions were usually held in open space, in which a couple of thousand members could participate. One of the major groups at this point of time, were the conservative Defenders of the Constitution, who were initially allied with the Karađorđević dynasty. After the overthrow of Obrenović dynasty in 1842, they held a majority in the parliament.

Ilija Garašanin, who was one of the members of the conservative group, called for the adoption of a law that would officially form the National Assembly. This was done in December 1858, when the Saint Andrew's Day Assembly was established. Its first name was also adopted at the assembly, which was the "Serbian National Assembly". After the adoption, sessions were initially held every three years, although this was later changed over the time, and later sessions were either held once a year, or once every three or four years. The first law regarding MPs was adopted in 1870.

Competencies
The competencies the National Assembly are defined by the Constitution of Serbia, articles 98–110:

 adopts and amends the Constitution;
 decides on changes concerning the borders of Serbia;
 calls for the national referendum;
 ratifies international contracts when the obligation of their ratification is stipulated by the Law;
 decides on war and peace and declares state of war or emergency;
 supervises the work of security services;
 enacts laws and other general acts;
 gives prior consent to the Statute of the autonomous province;
 adopts defence strategy;
 adopts development plan and spatial plan;
 adopts the budget and end-of-year balance, at the government's proposal;
 grants amnesty for criminal offences.
 elects the Government, supervises its work and decides on expiry of term of office of the government and ministers;
 appoints and dismisses the Governor of the National Bank of Serbia and supervises their work;
 appoints and dismisses other officials stipulated by the Law.

Performs other functions stipulated by the Constitution and Law.

Elections

Parliamentary elections are regulated by the Constitution. The elections are held after the four-year term of the previous assembly has expired, but can also be held before that if the National Assembly dismisses the Government or the Government resigns and no majority can be reached to elect a new Government. Elections are called by the President of Serbia 90 days before the end of the term of office of the National Assembly, so that elections are finished within the following 60 days. Elections are closed party-list proportional. The whole country is one electoral district. 250 seats are then distributed between the lists using d'Hondt method. There is a minimum voting threshold of 3% so that only the party lists which get more than 3% of the votes are awarded the seats. There is no threshold for the ethnic minority lists.

After the elections, the first session of the new Assembly is convened by the Speaker from the previous convocation, so that the session is held not later than 30 days from the day of declaring the final election results.

Deputies
The assembly is composed of 250 deputies. At least 30% of the deputies are women. Deputies may not hold dual functions which represent a conflict of interest. Deputies enjoy parliamentary immunity.

President and vice-presidents
By means of majority votes of all deputies, the National Assembly elects the President of the Assembly (speaker) and one or more Vice-presidents (deputy speakers), usually one vice-president from each parliamentary group. The President of the National Assembly represents the National Assembly, convokes its sessions, presides over them and performs other official activities. The Vice-presidents assist the President in performing the duties within their purview.

In case the President is temporarily absent, one of the Vice-Presidents designated by them stands in for them. If the President does not designate any of the Vice-presidents to stand in for them, the oldest Vice-President shall stand in for them.

The Secretary of the National Assembly is appointed by the National Assembly. Secretary of the National Assembly assists the President and Vice-Presidents in preparing and chairing sittings. Their term of office is terminated upon the constitution of a newly elected National Assembly, while they shall continue discharging their duties until the appointment of a new Secretary. Secretary is not elected from the deputies, and is not a member of the Assembly.

Parliamentary groups
Parliamentary groups in the National Assembly must be formed no later than seven days following the election of the President.

Any grouping of five or more deputies can be officially recognised as a parliamentary group, with each deputy permitted to be members of only a single group at any one time. Although groups are mostly based on electoral lists from the previous election to the Assembly, groups are often a diverse collection of different parties as well as independents. This is due to Serbia's complex multi-party system, with many parties having a presence in the legislature; parties with similar ideology, but low representation, are therefore inclined to cooperate and form joint parliamentary groups together to secure more privileges they would otherwise not be entitled to, such as additional speaking time and committee assignments. An example of such a group included the LDP–LSV–SDA group.

The parliamentary groups are each led by a president, who are usually assisted by a number of vice-presidents; it is common practice for heterogeneous groups (i.e. ones which comprise two or more parties) to have a vice-president from the junior party in the group. The presidents of the groups regularly meet with the President of the Assembly to discuss and arrange the agenda for future meetings.

Vacancies and replacements
Serbia's Law on the Election of Representatives (2000) initially indicated that, if an elected representative's mandate ended before the dissolution of the assembly, the right to fill the vacant position would "belong to the political party on whose electoral list the representative whose mandate [had] ceased was elected," and a new parliamentary mandate would be awarded to a candidate from the relevant party's electoral list who did not win a mandate in the general election. The law did not specify that the mandate would fall sequentially to the next candidate on the list who did not win a mandate. In addition, elected representatives whose party memberships were terminated or whose names were struck from the register of their party (or the political organisation on whose list they were elected) were automatically deemed to have their assembly mandates terminated; this latter provision was rescinded by a constitutional court decision in 2003.

This system was sometimes criticised. Vesna Pešić, for many years a prominent opposition figure in Serbia, noted in 2007 that it permitted party leaders to determine which candidates would enter parliament following elections, irrespective of where the candidates were placed on the lists. Pešić also stated that, after the 2003 constitutional court decision, members who entered the assembly were often required by their parties to sign blank resignation letters, by which means they could be expelled from parliament if they dissented from a party position. She argued that this led to corrupt practices, sometimes involving the misuse of assembly mandates to either keep governments in office or seek their overthrow. Daniel Bochsler, in a 2010 essay on Serbia's political system, also noted that the system gave party leaders significant control over individual mandates, although he added that the system of requiring blank resignation letters was "more understandable if we take into account that party switches are very common in post-communist legislatures, and not only in Serbia."

The law was reformed in 2011, to clarify that vacant mandates would be "awarded to the first candidate from the same electoral list who was not awarded a mandate" and that, in the event of a resignation of a member elected on a coalition list, the vacant mandate would fall to the first candidate on the list from the same party who was not awarded a mandate. It also established a provision for the return to parliament of members who resigned during the same convocation to take a position in government, and it stipulated that members would be required to submit resignation letters in person.

Since 2000
List of members of the National Assembly of Serbia, 2001–04
List of members of the National Assembly of Serbia, 2004–07
List of members of the National Assembly of Serbia, 2007–08
List of members of the National Assembly of Serbia, 2008–12
List of members of the National Assembly of Serbia, 2012–14
List of members of the National Assembly of Serbia, 2014–16
List of members of the National Assembly of Serbia, 2016–20
List of members of the National Assembly of Serbia, 2020–22
 List of members of the National Assembly of Serbia, 2022–26

List of presidents
2007 (acting): Borka Vučić
May 2007 (acting): Tomislav Nikolić
2007 (acting) Milutin Mrkonjić
2007–2008: Oliver Dulić
2008–2012: Slavica Đukić Dejanović
2012–2014: Nebojša Stefanović
2014–2020: Maja Gojković
2020–2022: Ivica Dačić
2022 (acting) Vladeta Janković
2022–present: Vladimir Orlić

Sessions

The first session of the new Assembly is convened by the Assembly Speaker from the previous convocation. The first sitting of the National Assembly is chaired by the oldest deputy. They are assisted in their work by the youngest deputy from each of the four party lists that polled the largest number of seats, and by the Secretary of the Assembly
from the previous convocation. At the first sitting of the National Assembly, the President of the Assembly, Vice-Presidents, and the members of the working bodies of the National Assembly are elected and the Secretary of the National Assembly is appointed.

The National Assembly is convoked for two regular sessions per year, starting on the first workdays of March and October. The Assembly is convoked for extraordinary session at the request of at least one-third of the deputies or the request of the Government, with previously determined agenda. The National Assembly can be convoked without an announcement upon the declaration of the state of war or emergency. The proposed agenda for a National Assembly sitting is prepared by the president. A quorum for the work of
the National Assembly exists if a minimum of one-third of deputies are present at the National Assembly sitting. The quorum for the work of the National Assembly on Voting Days exists if at least 126 deputies are present at the sitting.

The right to propose laws, other regulations and general acts belongs to every deputy, the government, assemblies of autonomous provinces or at least 30,000 voters. The Ombudsman and National Bank of Serbia also have the right to propose laws falling within their competence. Upon the request of the majority of all deputies or at least 100,000 voters, the National Assembly may call a referendum on issues falling within its competence.

The National Assembly adopts decisions by majority vote of deputies at the session at which the majority of deputies are present. The deputies vote "For" a motion, "Against" a motion, or abstain from voting.

If the Assembly is in crisis, The President of the Republic may dissolve the National Assembly, upon an elaborated proposal of the government. The government may not propose dissolution of the Assembly if a proposal has been submitted to dismiss the Government. The National Assembly is also dissolved if it fails to elect the Government within 90 days from the day of its constitution. The National Assembly may not be dissolved during the state of war and emergency. The National Assembly, which has been dissolved, only performs current or urgent tasks. In case of declaration of the state of war or emergency, its full competence is re-established and lasts until the end of the state of war, that is, emergency.

Acts
Acts passed by the National Assembly are:
 laws;
 budget;
 development plan;
 spatial plan;
 financial statement;
 Rules of procedure;
 declarations;
 resolutions;
 recommendations;
 decisions;
 conclusions; and
 authentic interpretations of the acts it passes.

The Rules of Procedure of the National Assembly of Serbia regulate the organisation and work of the National Assembly and the manner in which the deputies' rights and duties are exercised.

Committees
Committees or boards (odbor) are standing working bodies of the National Assembly established to consider and review issues falling within the purview of the National Assembly, to propose official documents, as well as to carry out reviews of policies pursued, and laws, by-laws and other regulations implemented by the Government, to be done by each Committee for the field that falls within its purview; and also to perform other duties foreseen by the Rules of Procedure. There are 30 standing Committees, and each Committee may, from its midst, appoint one or more sub-committees to consider certain issues from its purview.

Before being considered by the National Assembly, a bill is considered by competent Committees and the Government, if it is not the submitter of the bill. In their opinion, the Committees and the Government may propose that the National Assembly accept or reject the bill.

Parliamentary Groups nominate members for each Committee proportionally to the number of deputies they have at the National Assembly. The proposed candidate list for Committee members is voted on as a unit, by open voting.

Building

The national assembly convenes in the House of the National Assembly building, located on Nikola Pašić Square in downtown Belgrade.

Composition

Leadership
President (Speaker): Vladimir Orlić 
Secretary general: Srđan Smiljanić

Members

In popular culture
National Assembly of Serbia appears in a video game Half-Life 2 as a Overwatch Nexus

References

Primary sources 
In the text these references are preceded by a double dagger (‡):

Notes

External links

 
 The National Assembly Artwork

Politics of Serbia
Government of Serbia
Serbia
Serbia
Serbia